Brassolis is a genus of Neotropical butterflies in the family Nymphalidae.

Species
Brassolis astyra Godart, [1824]
Brassolis haenschi Stichel, 1902
Brassolis isthmia Bates, 1864
Brassolis sophorae (Linnaeus, 1758)

References

External links
images representing Brassolis at Consortium for the Barcode of Life

Morphinae
Nymphalidae of South America
Nymphalidae genera
Taxa named by Johan Christian Fabricius